As Seen Through a Telescope (AKA: The Professor and His Field Glass) is a 1900 British short  silent comedy film, directed by George Albert Smith, featuring an elderly gentleman getting a glimpse of a woman's ankle through a telescope. The three-shot comedy, according to Michael Brooke of BFI Screenonline, "uses a similar technique to that which G.A. Smith pioneered in Grandma's Reading Glass (1900)," and although, "the editing is unsophisticated, the film does at least show a very early example of how to make use of point-of-view close-ups in the context of a coherent narrative (which is this film's main advance on Grandma's Reading Glass)." "Smith's experiments with editing," Brooke concludes, "were ahead of most contemporary film-makers, and in retrospect it can clearly be seen that he was laying the foundations of film grammar as we now understand it."

Production
The film was shot in Furze Hill, Hove, England outside the entrance to St. Ann's Well Gardens, where Smith had his studio.

References

External links

 

1900 films
1900s British films
British silent short films
British black-and-white films
1900 comedy films
1900 short films
Films directed by George Albert Smith
Articles containing video clips
British comedy short films
Silent comedy films